Festival of speed, a name given to motorsport events, may refer to:

 Asian Festival of Speed, in Asian countries, especially Malaysia and China; see Zhuhai International Circuit
 Goodwood Festival of Speed, in the United Kingdom
 Monterey Festival of Speed, in the United States; see 2008 Atlantic Championship
 Southern Festival of Speed, in New Zealand